Moldova 2 is the second public television channel in Moldova, launched on 3 May 2016 on the occasion of the 58th anniversary of Teleradio-Moldova.

The broadcast started with images from the Cup to Table Tennis among journalists of "Press Open Moldova 1". The launch of Moldova 2 came on the recommendation of the European Broadcasting Union, but also on the need to cover the transmission of a large amount of sport content.

Programming
The station broadcasts replays of Moldova 1 and direct broadcasts from sports events, such as the Summer Olympics and the European Football Championship.

Distribution
Moldova 2 is available nationwide via cable networks.

References

External links
 

Television channels in Moldova
Television channels and stations established in 2016
2016 establishments in Moldova
Romanian-language television stations
Mass media in Chișinău
Teleradio-Moldova